In physics, biology and chemistry, electron magnetic resonance (EMR) is an interdisciplinary field with several forms: electron paramagnetic resonance (EPR), electron spin resonance (ESR) and electron cyclotron resonance (ECR). EMR looks at electrons rather than nuclei or ions as in nuclear magnetic resonance (NMR) and ion cyclotron resonance (ICR) respectively.

References

Electromagnetism